"If You Must" is a song by American hip hop musician Del the Funky Homosapien. It was released as a single from his 2000 album, Both Sides of the Brain. The single peaked at number 27 on the Billboard Hot Rap Songs chart.

Track listing

Charts

References

External links
 

2000 singles
2000 songs
Del the Funky Homosapien songs